Vicente Matute (born 19 July 1932) is a Venezuelan boxer. He competed in the men's lightweight event at the 1952 Summer Olympics.

References

1932 births
Living people
Venezuelan male boxers
Olympic boxers of Venezuela
Boxers at the 1952 Summer Olympics
Place of birth missing (living people)
Lightweight boxers